Tarmashirin Khan (ruled 1331 AD - 1334 AD) was the khan of the Chagatai Khanate following Duwa Timur.

Biography 
Tarmashirin is famous for his campaign in the Indian subcontinent in 1327 before he was enthroned. The city of Lahore was sacked by him in the year 1329. He unsuccessfully invaded the Ilkhanate.

He was one of the notable rulers of the Chagatai Khanate to convert to Islam. He took the name Ala-ad-din after becoming a Muslim. His conversion to Islam did not go down well with his Mongol nobles, who were overwhelmingly Tengriist and Buddhist. He sent letters with tributes to the court of Yuan Dynasty. Because Tarmarshirin preferred to dwell in cities of Transoxiana, he was accused of abandoning the traditional Mongol code of conduct, Yassa, and was deposed in the horde's annual kurultai. He was killed by the Eastern Chagatayid princes later in flight near Samarkand.
                                                                                        
Muslim sources have always portrayed Tarmashirin in a very favorable light owing to his seminal effort in bringing Islam into inner Asia. The famous Muslim traveler and writer Ibn Batuta had visited the khan during his travel through Tarmashirin's realms.

References

 

1334 deaths
Chagatai khans
Mongol Empire Muslims
14th-century monarchs in Asia
Year of birth unknown